The Hindu American Foundation is an American Hindu advocacy group founded in 2003. The organisation has its roots in the Hindu nationalist organisation Vishwa Hindu Parishad America and its student wing Hindu Students Council. Scholars argue that HAF's activism aligns with Hindu nationalism and impinges on academic freedom.

Establishment
The Hindu American Foundation (HAF) was founded in September 2003 by Mihir Meghani, an emergency care physician; Aseem Shukla, an associate professor in urologic surgery; Suhag Shukla, an attorney; Nikhil Joshi, a labor law attorney; and Adeeti Joshi, a speech therapist. The organization describes itself as a human rights and advocacy group and emphasizes upon the "Hindu and American ideals of understanding, tolerance and pluralism."

The first Hindu advocacy organization to have a professional organizational structure and full-time staff, it is widely considered to be the most prominent Hindu advocacy organization operating out of America. Scholar Vinay Lal notes that the organization drew on the claims of Hinduism being unique in its tolerance and religious pluralism as well as the enormous goodwill created by Gandhi in the West.

Hindu nationalist ties 
Mihir Meghani had also founded the University of Michigan's chapter of the Hindu Students Council (HSC), a nationwide network of student societies affiliated with the Vishwa Hindu Parishad America (VHPA), in 1991. He served on the governing council of VHPA and had even authored an essay for the Bharatiya Janata Party (BJP), comparing Hindus—a religious majority in India—with Jews, Black Americans, and colonized groups, whose bottled-up anger, for over a millennium, found a channel of outburst in the rise of BJP and demolition of the Babri Masjid. Coalition Against Genocide (CAG)—a platform established in the aftermath of 2002 Gujarat riots against Hindu Nationalist violence directed at minorities—alleges the formation of the Hindu American Foundation to have been the outcome of Meghani's parleys on the governing council of VHPA and an effort to rebrand the Hindutva agenda as "Hindu rights" in a language suitable to mainstream American politics; Sangay K. Mishra, an assistant professor of political science at Drew University, agrees about the repackaging motto.

CAG further notes most of the office bearers of the Hindu American Foundation to have had been drawn from HSC activists. Georgetown University's Bridge Initiative finds HAF board member Rishi Bhutada to have been the official spokesperson of 'Howdy Modi', a RSS backed rally in support of India's incumbent prime minister from BJP held in Houston on 22 September 2020; a report published by BBC notes HAF to have lobbied support in favor of Modi among the diaspora. In September 2019, HAF published an open letter criticizing congressman Ro Khanna's public plea to reject Hindutva. The Bridge Initiative as well as several journalists have documented anti-Muslim statements made by HAF board members, past and present, and individuals invited to speak by HAF.

Academic and journalists have also documented money trails linking HAF to other Sangh Parivar groups via their donors. Sonia Sikka, an academic specializing on the intersections of the religious and the political, notes clear alignments between HAF's activities and the politics of Hindutva Nationalism despite their claims to non-partisanship. Nishant Upadhyyay, a professor at the University of Colorado, Boulder, specializing in gender and sexuality studies finds HAF's queer-friendly portrayal of Hinduism to be embedded within a discourse of Hindutva homonationalism. Chad Bauman, a professor of religion at Butler University, contends HAF's portrayal of Hinduism to be misleadingly monolithic and sanitized, in service of a political agenda. HAF denies these charges, claims to non-partisanship, and has filed a defamation suit against a wide range of organisations and individuals that alleged its links to Hindutva.

Nonetheless, Arun Chaudhuri, an anthropologist of religion and politics at York University, cautions that such disavowals are not be taken as face value but rather as efforts at distancing from the negative connotations of Hindu Nationalism. Sailaja Krishnamurti, a professor at Saint Mary's University (Halifax) who specializes in religious traditions of the South Asian diaspora, summarizes that HAF has "earned a reputation" of being a conservative group purveying Hindu Nationalist politics. As does Ilyse Morgenstein Fuerst, a historian specializing in S. Asian religions at the University of Vermont, who qualifies HAF as a "deeply conservative" outfit. Audrey Truschke, a historian of South Asia at Rutgers University, finds HAF to be an integral component of the "wider Sangh Parivar" and Hindu-Right in USA; she notes the organization to have "prioritized attacks on higher education".

Activism

Hindu persecution in other countries 
During 2004–05, the organization held events to educate legislators about issues of concern to Hindu Americans. These included the abuse of Hindus in the Muslim majority regions of South Asia, including Kashmir, Bangladesh and Pakistan. Since then, they have continued to publish regular "Hindu Human Rights" reports to such effect. They have critiqued Pakistan's treatment of Hindus and advocated for better assimilation and integration of Pakistani Hindu migrants/refugees in India. The organization also supports strong ties between India, Israel and the US to create an axis of countries aiming to fight Islamic terrorism.

Hindu rights in USA 
In 2004, HAF challenged the public display of the Ten Commandments in Texas, where it appeared as amici curiae (friend of the Court) in Van Orden v. Perry in the United States Supreme Court; they argued that the display represented an "inherent government preference" for Judeo-Christian religions over others and the state must be reminded of its obligation to maintain religious neutrality. In 2005, it joined the American Jewish Committee (AJC) to jointly sponsor a program at Stanford University on "countering biases against Hindus and Jews on the College campus." In 2008, HAF, along with a coalition of other religious groups, filed a lawsuit and blocked the issuance of Christian themed license plates in South Carolina.

In 2013, HAF joined a coalition of Christian, Jewish, Hindu, Sikh, and Muslim organizations urging the Justice Department investigate the New York City Police Department for discriminatory surveillance of American Muslims. In 2015, as a part of the Hate Crimes Coalition, HAF participated in the drafting and submission of the edits to an FBI manual to specifically track hate crimes against Hindus, Sikhs and Muslims. In 2016, HAF along with Indiaspora and other organizations successfully convinced the United States Postal Service to issue a stamp commemorating the Hindu festival of Diwali.

Visa to Narendra Modi 
In 2002, Gujarat witnessed a communal riot under the Chief Ministership of Narendra Modi; the incumbent government and even Modi himself is widely blamed by scholars for complicity. In 2005, when Modi was invited to address the Asian-American Hotel Owners Association in 2005, activists including John Prabhudoss lobbied the United States Congress to introduce a resolution criticizing him for his role in those riots. HAF deemed this resolution "Hinduphobic" and lobbied Senators to not support it; nonetheless, the resolution later led to the State Department denying Modi a visa to enter the country.

Take Yoga Back 
In 2010, the Foundation launched the eponymous campaign as a reaction to alleged cultural appropriation and secularization of yoga by popular press and neo-gurus who abstained from discussing the origins of yoga in Hinduism and corrupted a Hindu philosophical practice to a mere collection of physical postures. Particular emphasis was laid on the Hindu nature of Yoga manuals across centuries to corroborate claims of Yoga being a Hindu form of spiritual quest.

Andrea Jain, a professor of Religious Studies at Indiana University, finds such claims to be embedded within a polemical discourse of religious fundamentalism that unwittingly borrowed from and mirrored the West—while HAF waxed about the inevitable Hinduization of anybody who chooses to practice Yoga in its true essence, the Christian far-right denounced Yoga as a satanic act which took practitioners away from Christ into the fold of Brahmins. Furthermore, Jain finds HAF's essentialist discourse on Yoga to be ahistorical—Yoga was a fluid tradition which was made and remade by different socioreligious cultures across different times with different connotations. Other scholars reiterate Jain's observations; Christopher Patrick Miller, a professor of Yoga Studies at Loyola Marymount University, finds it ironical that to defend against perceived Christian ingressions, HAF had to borrow from Christian (and colonial) notions of what constituted a Yogic cannon.

Caste 
in 2010, HAF issued a report titled "Hinduism: Not Cast in Caste" alleging that Christian missionaries etc. were able to push their proselytizing agenda only because of the prevalence of caste-discrimination in India; it went to argue that caste cannot be considered to be an intrinsic definitional aspect of Hinduism—due to a lack of theological sanction in its most sacred texts—and urged for reforms led by Hindus themselves. This led to a flutter in conservative Hindu circles of India and the next year, HAF toned down their report; they cautioned against the trend of passing resolutions against caste discrimination adopted by various global organizations and held caste to be an internal affair of a sovereign India. HAF has since portrayed castes as occupational guilds which had brought stability to premodern India before being reified under British colonialism; it has vehemently opposed drawing parallels between caste-discrimination and racism, and even any depiction of the caste-system as a rigid birth-determined pyramid of hierarchy.

In 2021, on the heels of prolonged transnational activism by Dalits, "caste" was added as a protected category to California State University's anti-discrimination policy. HAF perceived such policies to have the potential of enabling in the malicious targeting of Indian Hindu academics and lodged stiff opposition; their post-bearers argued caste to be a "stereotype", that was imposed upon South Asians only by the British Raj. Ajantha Subramaniam, a professor of South Asian Studies at Harvard University, rejects HAF's charges and accompanying accusations of being discriminated on the basis of religion; she and other scholars emphasize on the depth of scholarship that has held caste to be a reality of central significance from premodern S. Asia to present day India including diaspora.

In September 2022, HAF sued the California Department of Civil Rights for allegedly misrepresenting caste as intrinsic to Hinduism in its submission to the Cisco caste discrimination lawsuit. In October 2022, two University of California professors sued their employer to prevent the implementation of caste-based protections; HAF is representing them in the lawsuit.

Attacks on academic freedom

Textbook revisionism 

In 2006, HAF was actively involved in the Californian Hindu textbook controversy. On 16 March 2006, it filed a lawsuit contesting the California's Curriculum Commission's decision to reject many of the Vedic Foundation and Hindu Education Foundation's suggested edits to California's textbook curriculum on Hinduism and India. The proposed changes had been publicly opposed by Indologists organized by Michael Witzel, who renounced them as "politically and religiously motivated", as well as by various Hindu groups.
The court ruled to retain the textbooks, noting the significant expense associated with reissuing the textbooks.

In 2016, the HAF lobbied against the replacement of the word "Indian" with "South Asian" in middle school history textbooks in California, arguing that the change was essentially an erasure of India itself. These efforts were protested by South Asian academics and activists belonging to India's minority groups, who said that those on the side of the HAF sought to whitewash California's history textbooks to present a nativist, blemish-free view of how the Hindu caste system was enforced in India. They also argued that the term "South Asia" correctly represents India's collective history with countries like Pakistan and Bangladesh. A letter to the California State Board of Education about this issue, which garnered thousands of signatures, was spearheaded by the HAF.

2021 defamation suit 
In May 2021, the Hindu American Foundation filed a defamation lawsuit against Sunita Viswanath and Raju Rajagopal of Hindus for Human Rights, Rasheed Ahmed from the Indian American Muslim Council, John Prabhudoss from the Federation of Indian American Christian Organizations, and Audrey Truschke, a historian of South Asia based at Rutgers University. A diverse group of intellectuals and academics — Akeel Bilgrami, Amitav Ghosh, Anita Desai, Cornel West, Martha Nussbaum, Nandini Sundar, Noam Chomsky, Romila Thapar, Sudipta Kaviraj, Sheldon Pollock, and Wendy Doniger among others — condemned HAF's tactics as a SLAPP, designed to silence critics and push forward Hindutva.

On 15 March 2022, Judge Amit Mehta stayed defendants' motions to dismiss the suit since he deemed one of their arguments about whether HAF had satisfied the second requirement of invoking diversity jurisdiction — by proving the amount of monetary loss to have exceeded 75,000 USD — as a "substantial question" of procedure, that needed to be settled prior to adjudication on merits. Discovery was ordered, and Judge Mehta accepted HAF's evidence to pass muster. However, on 20 December 2022, he dismissed the suit since HAF had failed not only to establish any cause of action even assuming that their allegations were factually accurate but also evidence that the court had any personal jurisdiction over the defendants except one.

Dismantling Global Hindutva conference 
During August–September 2021, the Hindu American Foundation launched a protest campaign against a virtual conference, titled Dismantling Global Hindutva: Multidisciplinary Perspectives organised by a conglomeration of American Universities. Multiple academics and activists involved in the conference reported receiving death threats and being subject to other forms of intimidation. In response, the American Historical Association condemned the attacks against academic freedom, while the Association for Asian Studies noted Hindutva to be a "majoritarian ideological doctrine" different from Hinduism, whose rise to prominence had accompanied "increasing attacks on numerous scholars, artists and journalists".

The conference went ahead as scheduled. HAF has since lodged a complaint against the University of Pennsylvania before the United States Department of Education's Office of Civil Rights for violating Title VI requirements—they allege that the university, having co-sponsored a "one-sided" conference, promoted negative "stereotypes and slurs" about Hindu academics and discriminated against them. Multiple Hindu professors of UPenn rejected the accusations and highlighted how transnational Hindutva was weaponized to stifle free speech.

Notes

References

Sources

External links

 
 Mihir Meghani, Hindutva: The Great Nationalist Ideology, bjp.org, archived on 17 January 1997.
 Documents from the Hindu American Foundation’s SLAPP Lawsuit, audreytruschke.com, January 2023.

Religious organizations established in 2003
Hindu organizations based in the United States
Hindu organizations established in the 21st century
2003 establishments in the United States
Human rights organizations based in the United States
Civil liberties advocacy groups in the United States
Advocacy groups in the United States